Sri Nilamadhava Temple is very old and famous Lord Vishnu temple which is near to the bank of Mahanadi, in Kantilo, Odisha, India. It is present near to the twin hills with a surrounding forest.  A permanent flow of holy water from the feet of Lord Nilamadhava is another attraction of the spot. Lord Siddheswar is also present which is another highlight of the place.

Lord Nilamadhav occupies a central position in the cult of Lord Jagannath. Even now also Lord Nilamadhava shrine is present on the right side of Lakshmi temple in Puri Jagannath Temple.

Location
Kantilo is situated near the river bank of Mahanadi which comes in a block called Khandapada, in Nayagarh District. Nearest railway station is Nayagarh Town and nearest airport is Bhubaneswar. It is advisable that if you are planning to come by train its better get down at Bhubaneswar station because from there you will get frequent buses to Kantilo. Roads are connected to Kantilo which offer regular bus services. It is 82  km from state capital Bhubaneswar and 33 km from Nayagarh District.

History
It all initiated in a small cave in the Brahmadri hills situated on the banks of Mahanadi, which is known as Kantilo of Nayagarh district today. Here, Biswabasu the local Sabara Chief worshipped Kitung, as the God was known in the Sabara dialect. According to the Puranas, the deity was originally worshipped in the form of an Indranila gem image known as “Nilamadhava". The daru murti came much later.Located near the confluence of three rivers Mahanadi, Kuanria and Kusumi. The temple structure is like the Jagannath temple of Puri. It stands on the right bank of Mahanadi. It is called triveni sangam of Odisha. As there is Beni-Madhava in Prayag, so as here Nilamadhava.

Festivals
Maagha saptami Festival or Ratha Saptami is the best festival over here.
A fair is held on the Ekadashi of the month of Maagha
 A special feastival on 'PAUSA PURNIMA' .  On this occasion, Lord Neelamadhab is decorated with gold ornaments.

See also
Jagannath
Madhava (Vishnu)

References

information regarding the blue hued lord
image of the temple
reports on archaeological survey

Hindu temples in Nayagarh district
Vishnu temples
Archaeological monuments in Odisha